Šefik Bešlagić (6 April 1908 – 19 November 1990) was a cultural historian from Yugoslavia. From 1953 to 1967 Šefik Bešlagić was the director of the Institute for the Protection of Cultural Monuments of Bosnia and Herzegovina. He explored the medieval necropolis of marble or Stećci. He was a historian of material culture, especially of stones (Stećci, nišani, čatrnje, stolice).

Biography 
Bešlagić was born in the town of Gornja Tuzla in 1908. His mother Devleta (née Mulalić) was a housewife, while his father Agan was a teacher.

Šefik Bešlagić was educated in Tuzla, Doboj and Sarajevo, before teaching in Derventa and Gračanica.

Historiography 
Nada Miletić and Alojz Benac dated the phenomenon of the stećak to the thirteenth century, but this dating has been debated, in particular by Bešlagić and Dubravko Lovrenović, who date the tombstones to the mid-twelfth century.

References 

1908 births
1990 deaths
Writers from Tuzla
Cultural historians
Yugoslav historians
Yugoslav medievalists